Perissoza scripta is a species of ulidiid or picture-winged fly in the genus Perissoza of the family Ulidiidae.

References

Ulidiidae